Doms in Libya speak the Domari language. They immigrated to the territory of the present day Libya from South Asia, particularly from India, in Byzantine times. (Dom or Nawar) people self-segregated themselves for centuries from the dominant culture of Libya. Historically, Gypsies in Libya have provided musical entertainment as weddings and other celebrations. The Dom people in Libya include subgroups like Nawar, Halebi and Ghagar.

See also
Doms in Egypt
Doms in Syria
Doms in Iraq
Nawar people

References

External links
The Gypsies of Libya, Dom Research Center

Ethnic groups in Libya
Dom in Africa
Dom people